Euphaedra graueri is a butterfly in the family Nymphalidae. It is found in the eastern part of the Democratic Republic of the Congo.

References

Butterflies described in 1918
graueri
Endemic fauna of the Democratic Republic of the Congo
Butterflies of Africa